Dal Zotto or Del Zotto is a surname. Notable people with the surname include:

Antonio Dal Zòtto (1841–1918), Italian sculptor
Fabio Dal Zotto (born 1957), Italian fencer 
Renan Dal Zotto (born 1960), Brazilian volleyball player 
Michael Del Zotto (born 1990), Canadian ice hockey defenceman